The Chilean Gendarmerie, (abbreviated to GENCHI) is the title of Chile's uniformed national prison service military . The title is historic, The service evolved out of Chilean Army units which were given police and prison duties.

It is an armed service responsible to the Ministry of Justice. It has two mottoes, "Labor Omnia Vincit" ("Work conquers everything"), and "Deus Patria Lex" (God, Country, Law). Its symbol is a keep.

The service is currently led by Director General of the Gendarmerie Sebastián  urrua palma, appointed to this role by the Chilean president in 2022.

Early history 
Chilean Army units were used for policing and guarding prisons from the time of Chile's independence. Chile's first "professional" prison was built in Santiago in 1843. In 1871 the "Special Guard" was created (Guardia Especial) which was Chile's first prison service separate from the army.

A Gendarme battalion, the Bulnes Battalion, fought as part of the Chilean Army during the War of the Pacific.

In 1892, under the government of Admiral Jorge Montt, the service was called "Special Guards of the Prisons of Chile" (Guardias Especiales de las Prisiones de Chile) and was responsible for prisons, executions, and prisoner transport.

Modern history
In 1911, under the government of Ramón Barros Luco, the Special Guards experienced some reforms and the title "Prison Gendarmerie Corps" was adopted (Cuerpo de Gendarmería de Prisiones). It had the additional duty of guarding prisoners in court. The vast majority of members of this new service were seconded from the Army, including officers and other ranks - the very reason for the current military heritage of today's organization. A law was passed in 1921, Law N° 3.815, concerning the organization of the service. (From 1930 until today November 30 - the day the law took effect after its approval - is considered to be the anniversary of the Gendarmerie.)

A Prison Gendarmerie School was established in 1928 to train personnel, and from 1944 onward, became the officer training school of the service.

From 1929 until 1931, the service was part of the Carabiniers of Chile, the national Gendarmerie proper. During this time, it was known within the carabiniers as the Prison Service, and its members were "Prison Carabiniers". From 1931, the title "Prison Service" was used, and the service regained its independence.

In 1944 an academy was founded, called the Penitentiary School of Chile, which in 1954 became the Technical School of Prison Security Services.

During the dictatorship of General Augusto Pinochet Ugarte, the current title of "" was adopted, and a new grey-green uniform was adopted which was inspired by German army uniforms of World War II. The Gendarmerie's Penological Education Academy, the staff college of the service for all junior officers, was established in 1997.

Organization
The Chilean Gendarmerie is a service which is influenced by and actively maintains its historic links with the Chilean army. As a result, it is an armed uniformed service of a military character, and it is organized on a military basis using ranks. However the rank of Director General can be filled by either a veteran officer of the force  in either case under the appointment and confidence of the President. The current rank system dates from 2010 and is based on the historical ranks of the service.
It is a military institution that since its inception has provided security to the country..

Ranks of the Gendarmerie
Gendarmes of the ranks
Gendarms of the ranks are those that graduate from the "Gendarme Alex Villagrán Pañinao" Gendarmerie's Penitentiary Formation School.
  - Student Gendarme
  - Gendarme
  - Gendarme 2nd Class
  - Gendarme 1st Class
  - Lance Corporal
  - Corporal
  - Corporal First Class
  - Sergeant 
  - Staff Sergeant 
  - Sub-Officer
  - Senior Sub-Officer

Officers
All future officers study at the "Pres. Gen. Manuel Bulnes Prieto" Gendarmerie Academy in Santiago de Chile and upon graduation are commissioned as sub-lieutenants.
  - Aspirant
  - Sub-lieutenant
  - Second Lieutenant
  - First Lieutenant
  - Captain
  - Major
  - Lieutenant Colonel
  - Colonel
  - Operational Sub-director (Brigadier of the Gendarmerie)
  - National Director (General of the Gendarmerie)

The Gendarmiere also maintains a civilian technical and administrative corps, and although they report to both officers and gendarmes, they wear no uniforms at all.

Rank insignia

See also
Carabineros de Chile
Investigations Police of Chile
Crime in Chile

References

External links
Official website

National law enforcement agencies of Chile
Gendarmerie
Government of Chile
1929 establishments in Chile